|}

The Houghton  Mares' Chase is a Listed steeplechase in Great Britain which is open to fillies and mares aged four years or older. It is run at Carlise over a distance of about 2 miles and 4 furlongs (4,023 metres), and during its running there are sixteen fences to be jumped. It is scheduled to take place in later November or early December each year. The race was first run in 2015 as the ApolloBet Mares' Chase as part of a British Horseracing Authority move to enhance the National Hunt racing programme for mares.

Winners

See also 
 Horse racing in Great Britain
 List of British National Hunt races

References 

Racing Post:

National Hunt races in Great Britain
Carlisle Racecourse
National Hunt chases
Recurring sporting events established in 2015
2015 establishments in England